Canararctia is a monotypic tiger moth genus in the family Erebidae erected by Vladimir Viktorovitch Dubatolov in 1990. Its only species, Canararctia rufescens, was first described by Gaspard Auguste Brullé in 1836. It is endemic to La Gomera and Tenerife in the Canary Islands.

The moth flies year round.

The larvae feed on various plants, including Myrica faya, Rumex lunaria, Kleinia neriifolia, Ricinus communis, Nicotiana glauca and Sonchus congestus.

References

External links

Fotonatura.org Gallery

Spilosomina
Moths described in 1836
Taxa named by Gaspard Auguste Brullé
Monotypic moth genera